Manuel Poppinger (born 19 May 1989) is an Austrian ski jumper. His best World Cup finish was third in a team event in Zakopane in January 2014, while his best individual finish was eighth in Kulm.

References

1989 births
Austrian male ski jumpers
Living people
FIS Nordic World Ski Championships medalists in ski jumping
21st-century Austrian people